Second Honeymoon may refer to:

Film and television
Second Honeymoon (1930 film), an American silent film directed by Phil Rosen
Second Honeymoon (1937 film), an American comedy directed by Walter Lang
Second Honeymoon (1966 film), a British television film starring Arthur Askey
Second Honeymoon (2001 film), a film starring Roma Downey
Second Honeymoon (TV series), a 1987 Canadian game show

Other media
Second Honeymoon (novel), by James Patterson and Howard Roughan, 2013
Second Honeymoon, a 2006 novel by Joanna Trollope
"Second Honeymoon" (song), by Johnny Cash, 1960

See also
Honeymoon (disambiguation)